Rogi may refer to the following places:

Rogi, Lesser Poland Voivodeship (south Poland)
Rogi, Łódź Voivodeship (central Poland)
Rogi, Subcarpathian Voivodeship (south-east Poland)
Rogi, Lubusz Voivodeship (west Poland)
Rogi, Opole Voivodeship (south-west Poland)

or:

 Rugii, Germanic tribe